Urdari is a commune in Gorj County, Oltenia, Romania. It is composed of three villages: Fântânele, Hotăroasa and Urdari.

Natives
 Aurel Amzucu
 Albert Voinea

References

Communes in Gorj County
Localities in Oltenia